Gore Vidal: The Man Who Said No (1983) is a documentary film directed, produced, and edited by Gary Conklin. The film follows famed American writer and political gadfly Gore Vidal in his quixotic campaign against incumbent California Governor Jerry Brown for the Democratic nomination for the United States Senate in 1982. Vidal and State Sen. Paul B. Carpenter each won the support of 15.1% of voters in the primary election, but were easily outdistanced by Brown, who racked up 50.7% of the vote.

See also
United States Senate election in California, 1982

External links
Gore Vidal: The Man Who Said No at Gary Conklin Films

1983 films
Documentary films about writers
Documentary films about elections in the United States
1982 in American politics
1982 California elections
1980s English-language films
1980s American films